Leucanopsis luridioides is a moth of the family Erebidae. It was described by Walter Rothschild in 1917. It is found in Colombia, Ecuador and Peru.

References

luridioides
Moths described in 1917